Lawrence Joseph O'Neill (born September 5, 1952) is a senior United States district judge of the United States District Court for the Eastern District of California.

Early life and education
Born in Oakland, California, O'Neill served as a police officer for the City of San Leandro, California from 1973 to 1976. He received a Bachelor of Arts degree from the University of California at Berkeley in 1973, a Master of Public Administration degree from Golden Gate University in 1976, and a Juris Doctor from the University of California, Hastings College of the Law in 1979.

Career
O'Neill was a law clerk to Judge Robert F. Kane, First Appellate Court, California Court of Appeal in 1979. He was in private practice in Fresno from 1979 to 1990. Between 1986 and 1992, he was an adjunct professor at San Joaquin College of Law in Clovis. He was a judge on the Fresno County Superior Court for the State of California from 1990 to 1999. From 1999 to 2007, O'Neill served as a United States magistrate judge of the United States District Court for the Eastern District of California.

Federal judicial service
On January 9, 2007, O'Neill was nominated by President George W. Bush to a seat on the United States District Court for the Eastern District of California vacated by Oliver Winston Wanger. O'Neill was confirmed by the United States Senate on February 1, 2007, and received his commission on February 2, 2007. He served as Chief Judge from May 1, 2016, to December 31, 2019. He assumed senior status on February 2, 2020.

References

Sources

1952 births
Living people
American police officers
California state court judges
Golden Gate University alumni
Judges of the United States District Court for the Eastern District of California
People from Oakland, California
Superior court judges in the United States
United States district court judges appointed by George W. Bush
21st-century American judges
United States magistrate judges
University of California, Berkeley alumni
University of California, Hastings College of the Law alumni